is a Japanese handball player for Toyoda Gosei and the Japanese national team.

He represented Japan at the 2019 World Men's Handball Championship.

References

1993 births
Living people
Japanese male handball players